The  is a public transportation authority of Kagoshima City, Japan. The bureau operates trams and bus lines. From April 1, 2005, together with Nangoku Kōtsū and JR Kyūshū Bus, the bureau introduced RapiCa, a smart card ticketing system.

The bureau was founded in 1928, by taking over Kagoshima Electric Tramway, a private company. The tram line itself existed from 1912.

Kagoshima City Tram
Currently.  is one of the few tram lines in Japan that stably make profits. There are more than 10 million users annually.

Lines and routes

Lines: Officially, there are four lines with the total distance of 13.1 km.
Dai-Ikki-Line ("Phase 1 Line", 第一期線): Takenohashi — Kagoshima-Ekimae
Dai-Niki-Line ("Phase 2 Line", 第二期線): Takamibaba — Kagoshima-Chūō-Ekimae
Taniyama Line (谷山線): Takenohashi — Taniyama
Toso Line (唐湊線): Kagoshima-Chūō-Ekimae — Kōrimoto
Routes: There are two routes regularly in service by using one or more lines above.
■ Route 1 (1系統): Kagoshima-Ekimae — Takamibaba — Takenohashi — Kōrimoto — Taniyama
■ Route 2 (2系統): Kagoshima-Ekimae — Takamibaba — Kagoshima-Chūō-Ekimae — Kōrimoto

Tramcars come once per five minutes generally, once per one minute in busier sections. The fare is ¥170 for all the sections.

See also
List of light-rail transit systems
Little Dancer, one of the LRVs operated on its lines

External links 
  Official website

Bus companies of Japan
Tram transport in Japan
Rail transport in Kagoshima Prefecture
Intermodal transport authorities in Japan